The Ypsilanti Historical Society, founded in 1961, operates the Ypsilanti Historical Museum and Rudisill-Fletcher-White Archives in Ypsilanti, Michigan. The museum and archives are located at 220 N Huron St. in an Italianate mansion built in 1860 by Asa Dow. The house came into possession of the Ypsilanti Historical Society in 1970 after being owned by the city since 1966. In 2007 the Fletcher-White Archives moved from the property's carriage house into the basement of the main house.

The house is decorated like a house would be in 1860 Ypsilanti. It includes a dining room, bedroom, parlor with windows between the house walls, and a solarium with a slatted floor for watering plants and a roof vent to adjust the plants' temperature. There is also an Ypsilanti Room, featuring a permanent exhibit on the city’s history, dating all the way back to the Paleo Indian era.

The Rudisill-Fletcher-White Archives includes collections on Eastern Michigan University, Willow Run, and Ypsilanti Public Schools. Among the holdings are family Bibles, maps, city and county directories, postcards, yearbooks, news clippings, tax assessment rolls, and civil and criminal dockets. Through collaboration with the University of Michigan's Digital Library Production Service, the Ypsilanti Historical Society Photo Archives has made hundreds of images available online.

The Ypsilanti Historical Museum is a member of the MotorCities National Heritage Area. It hosts an annual Quilt Show. 

The society's quarterly publication, Ypsilanti Gleanings, has been published since 1973. It was awarded the 2009 State History Award for "Communications: Newsletters and Websites" by the Historical Society of Michigan. The publication is available digitally on the website of the Ypsilanti Historical Society.

References

External links 
 Ypsilanti Historical Society website
 Rudisill-Fletcher-White Archive's Master Database
 
 Asa Dow House on Flickr

Museums in Washtenaw County, Michigan
History museums in Michigan
Historic house museums in Michigan
Ypsilanti, Michigan
Historical societies in Michigan